Michał Haratyk (born 10 April 1992 in Cieszyn) is a Polish athlete specialising in the shot put.

Career
He made his international debut at the 2016 World Indoor Championships where he finished distant fourteenth despite having the third-farthest throw that indoor season. Later that year he achieved his biggest success to date by winning the silver medal in Amsterdam at the 2016 European Championships. His Olympic debut, however, was not as successful as he failed to qualify for the final at the Rio Games a month later.

He achieved 21.97 metres outdoors at the 2018 IAAF Diamond League meeting in Eugene. His personal best indoors is 21.47 metres (Toruń, 2018). In 2018, he set the new Polish record in shot put by achieving 22.08 metres at the Golden Spike Ostrava meeting. In 2019, he beat his previous record by achieving 22.32 metres at a sports meeting in Warsaw, which makes it the best result by a European shot putter in 21st century and moves him to fifth on the European outdoor all-time list.

Haratyk's older brother, Łukasz, was also a shot putter.

Competition record

References

1992 births
Living people
Polish male shot putters
People from Cieszyn
Sportspeople from Silesian Voivodeship
Athletes (track and field) at the 2016 Summer Olympics
Olympic athletes of Poland
European Athletics Championships medalists
European Athletics Championships winners
Polish Athletics Championships winners
European Athletics Indoor Championships winners
Athletes (track and field) at the 2020 Summer Olympics
20th-century Polish people
21st-century Polish people